Francino Rousseu Francis (born 18 January 1987) is a Jamaican footballer who is currently player-manager for West Midlands (Regional) League Premier Division side Wolverhampton Sporting, his position is defender.
He currently plays cricket for Rugeley CC in the 3rd XI

Career

Stoke City
Born in Kingston, Francis began playing for Tamworth, in the club youth academy, before being spotted by Stoke City in 2004. He never really made the grade with the club, and after one season playing mostly in the youth and reserves, he was released.

Watford
Francis joined Watford's Academy in July 2005. Whilst still an Academy scholar, he made his first team debut in a League Cup victory against Wolverhampton Wanderers on 20 September 2005, and also made substitute appearances against Leeds United and Wigan Athletic. He was an unused sub a further two times that season, as Watford gained promotion to the Premier League by winning the Championship play-off final against Leeds United at the Millennium Stadium.

In February 2006, he was sent on work experience to Kidderminster Harriers. While with The Harriers, Francis made six league appearances, including three starts, before returning to Vicarage Road. Following the expiry of his contract he was released by Watford manager Adrian Boothroyd after failing to impress in his first season with the club.

Halesowen Town
Francis went on to join Halesowen Town, but was released on 15 January 2008, by manager Morell Maison.

Willenhall Town
He then joined Southern Division One Midlands outfit Willenhall Town.

Barwell
Francis joined Barwell in 2008, where he was initially employed as a striker. However, with the club facing a defensive crisis, manager Marcus Law asked Francis to play a centre half in a match, following an injury to their current centre half, Francis played the role. He continued to play in the position and spent three seasons with the club, making 151 appearances and scoring 30 goals.

Tamworth
Francis re-joined his former Barwell manager Marcus Law at his new club Tamworth on 16 June 2011.

Francis became the first casualty in Tamworth's rebuilding for the 2012–13 season, after being released on 9 May 2012.

Hednesford Town
Francis started Hednesford's pre-season friendly against former club Tamworth on 28 July 2012, impressing enough to earn a contract.

Barwell return
In December 2014, Francis returned the club following his release from Hednesford Town.

Wolverhampton Sporting
Francino was confirmed as manager of West Midlands (Regional) League Premier Division side Wolverhampton Sporting on 26 September 2019.

References

External links

1987 births
Living people
Sportspeople from Kingston, Jamaica
Jamaican footballers
Jamaican expatriate footballers
Association football defenders
Association football forwards
Kidderminster Harriers F.C. players
Redditch United F.C. players
Stoke City F.C. players
Watford F.C. players
Wealdstone F.C. players
Halesowen Town F.C. players
Willenhall Town F.C. players
Barwell F.C. players
Tamworth F.C. players
Hednesford Town F.C. players
Chasetown F.C. players
Sutton Coldfield Town F.C. players
Hinckley A.F.C. players
Heath Hayes F.C. players
Wolverhampton Sporting C.F.C. players
English Football League players
National League (English football) players
Expatriate footballers in England